The 1993 Preakness Stakes was the 118th running of the Preakness Stakes thoroughbred horse race. The race took place on May 15, 1993, and was televised in the United States on the ABC television network. Prairie Bayou, who was jockeyed by Mike E. Smith, won the race by a half length over runner-up Cherokee Run. Approximate post time was 5:34 p.m. Eastern Time. The race was run over a fast track in a final time of 1:56-3/5. The Maryland Jockey Club reported total attendance of 97,641, this is recorded as second highest on the list of American thoroughbred racing top attended events for North America in 1993.

Union City, who did not finish this race due to injury, was euthanized as a result.  This race's winner, Prairie Bayou, would run in the Belmont Stakes, fail to finish it, and be euthanized as well.

Payout 

The 118th Preakness Stakes Payout Schedule

$2 Exacta:  (3–12) paid   $69.00

$2 Trifecta:  (3–12–2) paid   $2,258.60

The full chart 

 Winning Breeder: Loblolly Stable; (KY) 
 Final Time: 1:56 3/5
 Track Condition: Fast
 Total Attendance: 97,641

See also 

 1993 Kentucky Derby

References

External links 

 

1993
1993 in horse racing
1993 in American sports
1993 in sports in Maryland
Horse races in Maryland